Nationality words link to articles with information on the nation's poetry or literature (for instance, Irish or France).

Events
 May 30 – Composer Benjamin Britten's War Requiem, incorporating settings of Wilfred Owen's poems, is premièred for the consecration of the new Coventry Cathedral.
 September – Ted Hughes and Sylvia Plath separate.
 October
 Beginning this month, Sylvia Plath experiences a great burst of creativity, writing most of the poems on which her reputation will rest in what will be the last few months of her life, including many which will be published in Ariel and Winter Trees.
 Dame Edith Sitwell reads from her poetry at a concert at Royal Festival Hall in London given in honor of her 75th birthday.
 Writers in the Soviet Union this year are allowed to publish criticism of Joseph Stalin and are given more freedom generally, although many are severely criticized for doing so. The poet Yevgeny Yevtushenko, in the poem, The Heirs of Stalin, writes that more guards should be placed at Stalin's tomb, "lest Stalin rise again, and with Stalin the past". He also condemns anti-Semitism in the Soviet Union. His poetry readings attract hundreds and thousands of enthusiastic young people, to the point where police are often summoned to preserve order and disperse the crowds long after midnight. Other young poets also go beyond the previous limits of Soviet censorship: Andrei Voznesensky, Robert Rozhdestvensky, and Bella Akhmadulina (who has divorced Yevtushenko). Aleksandr Tvardovsky, editor of the literary monthly Novy Mir, supports many of the young writers. By the end of the year, the young writers have gained power in the official writers' unions which control much of the literary culture of the Soviet Union, and some publications which had attacked them are printing their work. American poet Robert Frost visits Russian poet Anna Akhmatova in her dacha.
 Michigan Quarterly Review is founded.

Works published in English
Listed by nation where the work was first published and again by the poet's native land, if different; substantially revised works listed separately:

Australia
 R. D. Fitzgerald, Southmost Twelve, Grace Leven Prize for Poetry
 Chris Wallace-Crabbe, Eight Metropolitan Poems, Adelaide: Australian Letters

Canada
 Earle Birney, Ice Cod Bell or Stone. Toronto: McClelland and Stewart.
 Wilson MacDonald, *Pugwash. Toronto: Pine Tree Publishing.
 John Newlove, The Things which Are
 Al Purdy, Poems for All the Annettes
 James Reaney, Twelve Letters to a Small Town. Governor General's Award 1962.
 A. J. M. Smith, Collected Poems
 F. R. Scott, St-Denys Garneau & Anne Hebert: Translations/Traductions. Translated by F. R. Scott. Vancouver: Klanak Press.
 Raymond Souster, A Local Pride. Toronto: Contact Press.
 Raymond Souster, Place of Meeting
 Wilfred Watson, The Sea is Also a Garden

Anthologies
 Irving Layton, editor, Love Where the Nights Are Long
 Editors of the Tamarack Review, a selection from its past issues, The First Five Years, including poetry

Biography, criticism and scholarship
 John Glassco, The Journal of Hector de Saint-Denys Garneau (translation)
 Canadian critics and poets, Masks of Poetry

India, in English
 Adil Jussawalla, Land's End ( Poetry in English ), Calcutta: Writers Workshop, India.
 Lawrence Bantleman, Graffiti  ( Poetry in English ), Calcutta: Writers Workshop, India.
 M. P. Bhaskaran, The Dancer and the Ring ( Poetry in English ), Calcutta: Writers Workshop, India.

United Kingdom
 Dannie Abse, Poems, Golders Green, including "The Abandoned", London: Hutchinson
 George Barker, The View From a Blind I
 Edmund Blunden, A Hong Kong House
 Ronald Bottrall, Collected Poems
 Tony Connor, With Love Somehow, London: Oxford University Press
 Patrick Creagh, A Row of Pharaohs
 Allen Curnow, A Small Room with Large Windows (Oxford University Press), selected poems by this New Zealand poet published in the United Kingdom
 C. Day-Lewis, The Gate, including "Not Proven" and "The Disabused"
 T. S. Eliot, Collected Poems 1909–1962
 D. J. Enright, Addictions, London: Chatto and Windus with Hogarth Press
 Roy Fuller, Collected Poems 1936-1961, London: André Deutsch
 Robert Graves, New Poems 1962
 Thom Gunn, Fighting Terms, a revision of a collection from the 1950s including "My Sad Captains"
 Thom Gunn and Ted Hughes, Selected poems by Thom Gunn and Ted Hughes, Faber
 Richard Kell, Control Tower
 Thomas Kinsella, Downstream, Irish poet published in the United Kingdom
 Peter Levi, Water, Rock and Sand
 Norman MacCaig, A Round of Applause, London: Chatto and Windus with Hogarth Press
 Christopher Middleton, Torse 3
 Ewart Milne, A Garland for the Green, Irish poet published in the UK
 Vernon Scannell, A Sense of Danger
 Dame Edith Sitwell, The Outcasts
 Stevie Smith, Selected Poems
 Jon Stallworthy, Out of Bounds
 R. S. Thomas, The Bread of Truth
 Anthony Thwaite, The Owl in the Tree
 J. R. R. Tolkien, The Adventures of Tom Bombadil, and Other Verses from the 'Red Book'''
 Charles Tomlinson, A Peopled Landscape Derek Walcott, In a Green Night the "most striking" first collection of poetry of 1962, according to Howard Sergeant, editor of Outposts (writing for publication in 1963). Walcott had already gained recognition with his plays.
 Vernon Watkins, Affinities T. H. White, VersesAnthologies
 Al Alvarez, editor, The New Poetry an anthology that provoked controversy with its omissions and inclusions
 James Reeves, editor, Georgian PoetryUnited States
 Brother Antoninus (William Everson), The Hazards of Holiness, 1957-1960, Garden City, New York: Doubleday
 John Ashbery, The Tennis Court Oath Robert Bly, Silence in the Snowy Fields, Middletown, Connecticut: Wesleyan University Press
 Kay Boyle, Collected Poems Gregory Corso, Long Live Man Robert Creeley, For Love: Poems 1950-1960, collected lyrics from his seven previous volumes, New York: Scribner's
 James Dickey, Drowning With Others William Faulkner, Prose and Poetry, fiction, nonfiction, verse
 Ian Hamilton Finlay, The Dancers Inherit the Party, 2nd edition, Ventura California and Worcester, England: Migrant Press, Scottish poet publishing in the United States
 Robert Frost, In the Clearing, his first collection of new poems in 15 years
 Paul Goodman, The Lordly Hudson: Collected Poems, New York: Macmillan
 Robert Hayden, A Ballad of Remembrance John Hollander, Movie-Going and Other Poems Richard Howard, Quantities Weldon Kees, Collected Poems, published posthumously (poet disappeared 1955)
 Kenneth Koch, Thank You and Other Poems Denise Levertov, The Jacob's Ladder Hugh MacDiarmid, Collected Poems, New York: Macmillan, Scottish poet publishing in the United States
 Norman Mailer, Deaths for the Ladies James Merrill, Water Street W. S. Merwin, The Life of Lazarillo de Tormes Christopher Middleton, torse 3, New York: Harcourt, Brace
 Vladimir Nabokov, Pale Fire, novel purporting to be a critical edition of a poem of this title written by the (fictional) American poet John Shade
 Ogden Nash, Everyone But Thee and Me, light verse
 Howard Nemerov, The Next Room of the Dream, University of Chicago Press
 Sylvia Plath, The Colossus and Other Poems, 1st U.S. edition, New York: Alfred A. Knopf, American poet resident in the United Kingdom
 Charles Reznikoff, By the Waters of Manhattan: Selected Verse David Ross, Three Ages of Lake Light, his first book of poems
 Muriel Rukeyser, Waterlily Fire: Poems 1935-1962,
 James Schevill, Private Dooms and Public Destinations: Poems 1945-1962, Denver: Alan Swallow
 Winfield Townley Scott, Collected Poems Anne Sexton, All My Pretty Ones, including "The Truth the Dead Know", Boston: Houghton Mifflin
 Edith Shiffert, In Open Woods, her first book of poems
 William Stafford, Traveling Through the Dark, New York: Harper & Row
 Diane Wakoski, Coins and Coffins Theodore Weiss, Gunsight, New York University Press
 Reed Whittemore, The Boy from Iowa William Carlos Williams, Pictures from Brueghel and Other PoemsCriticism, scholarship and biography in the United States
 Hugh Kenner, editor, T. S. Eliot: A Collection of Critical Essays (Prentice-Hall), Canadian writing published in the United States
 Karl Shapiro, Prose Keys to Modern PoetryOther in English
 Eavan Boland, 23 Poems, Ireland
 Ewart Milne, A Garland for the Green, Irish poet published in the UK
 Kendrick Smithyman, Inheritance, New Zealand

Works published in other languages
Listed by language and often by nation where the work was first published and again by the poet's native land, if different; substantially revised works listed separately:

French language

Canada, in French
 Gérard Bessette, Poèmes temporels Gilles Hénault, SémaphoreFrance
 Yves Bonnefoy, Anti-Platon, France
 André du Bouchet, Dans la chaleur vacante René Char, La Parole en archipel Jean Cocteau, La Requiem Jean-Paul de Dadelsen, Jonas, published posthumously (died 1957)
 Pierre Emmanuel, Evangéliaire André Frénaud, Il n'y a pas de paradis Jean Follain, Poèmes et Pros choisis, displaying some similarities to haiku
 Jean Grosjean, Apocalypse Pierre Jean Jouve, Moires Stéphane Mallarmé, Pour un tombeau d'Anatole, an abandoned and previously unpublished work, consisting of notes and drafts of an elegy the poet expected to write on his dead son (posthumous); edited by J. P. Richard
 Robert Marteau, Royaumes Henri Michaux, Vents et poussières, Paris: Flinker
 Saint-John Perse:
 Hommage à Rabindranath Tagore, Liège: Editions Dynamo
 L'ordre des oiseaux, Paris: Société d'Éditions d'art; republished as Oiseaux, Paris: Société d'Éditions d'art
 Valéry Larbaud; ou, L'Honneur littéraire, Liège: Editions Dynamo
 Marcelin Pleynet, Provisoires Amants des nègres Francis Ponge, Le Grand Recueil in three volumes
 Jean Claude Renard:
 Incantation du temps Incantation des eaux Michel Sager, XXI poèmes nocturnesCriticism and scholarship
 J. P. Richard, L'Univers imaginaire de MallarméGermany
 G. Benn, Lyrik des expressionistischen Jahrzehnts, anthology
 Johannes Bobrowski, Schattenland Ströme (Shadowland), East Germany
 Marie Luise Kaschnitz, Dein Schweigen-meine Stimmen Hilde Domin, Rückkehr der Schiffe Wilhelm Lehmann, Abschiedslust, Gedichte aus den Jahren 1957-1961, 37 poems
 Hans Magnus Enzensberger, Viele schöne Kinderreime, 777 poems for children

Hebrew
 Anonymous author from the Soviet Union, Zion Halo Tishali, poems originally written in Russian and clandestinely sent to Israel, edited and translated by A. Shlonsky and M. Sharett
 Avigdor Hameiri, Belivnat ha-Sapir ("Clear-cut Sapphire"), collected poems
 Levi Ben-Amittai, Matana Mimidbar ("Gift of the Desert")
 Yitzahak Ogen, Shirim ("Poems")
 P. Elad-Lander, Ke'raiah ha-Sadeh ("As the Fragrance of the Field")
 A. Halfi, Mul Kohavim ve-Afar ("Against Stars and the Dust")
 A. Meyrowitz, Avnai Bait ("Stones of a House")
 D. Avidan, Shirai Lahatz ("Poems of Pressure")
 Uri Bernstein, Beoto ha-Heder Beoto ha-Or ("In the Same Room, In the Same Light")
 T. Carmi, Nehash ha-Nehoshet ("Brass Serpent")
 J. Lichtenbaum, Shiratenu ("Our Poetry"), a two-volume anthology of Hebrew poetry from the end of the 18th century
 J. J. Schwartz, Kentucky, the only volume of Hebrew poetry published in the United States, according to The Britannica Book of the Year 1963 (covering events of 1962)

India
Listed in alphabetical order by first name:
 Barnardino Evaristo Mendes, also known as B. E. Mendes, Goenchem Git, Konkani
 Gulzar, Jaanam, New Delhi: Vanagi Publications; Urdu
 Maheswar Neog, Asamiya Sahityar Ruprekha, Assamese-language
 Ratnadhwaj Josi, Hamro Kavya Paramparama Usaiko Lagi ("Our Poetic Tradition"), criticism, Nepali

Italy
 A. Gatto, Carlomagno nella grotta Eugenio Montale, Satura, published in a private edition, Verona: Oficina Bodoni
 Cesare Pavese, Poesie edite e inedite, edited by Italo Calvino, Turin: Einaudi (posthumous)
 Maria Luisa Spaziani, Il gong P. Volponi, MemorialeSpanish language

Latin America
 Roque Dalton, El mar and El turno del ofendido (Salvadoran poet published in Cuba)
 Héctor Rojas Herazo, Mascando las tinieblas en el odio (Colombia)
 Alberto Hidalgo, Historia peruana verdadera José Martí, Versos (Cuban), posthumous; with an introduction by Eugenio Florit
 Pablo Neruda, a bilingual anthology of his selected verse; with an introduction by Louis Monguió
 Rubén Bonifaz Nuño, Fuego de pobres (Mexico)
 Carlos Pellicer, Material poético (Mexico)

Spain
 Jorge Guillén, Lenguaje y poesía A collaboration of 50 poets and 14 illustrators, Versos para Antonio Machado (published in France)

Yiddish
 Eliyohu Bokher, Bovo-bukh ("Buovo d'Antona") (posthumous) a 16th-century epic poem translated into modern Yiddish by Moyshe Knaphes
 Yaykev Glatshteyn, Di freyd fun yidishn vort (The Joy of the Yiddish World)
 N. I. Gotlib, a book of poetry
 Chaim Grade, Der mench fun fayer ("The Man of Fire")
 Rokhl Korn, a book of poetry
 Kadye Molodovsky, editor, Lider fun khurbn ("Poems of the Catastrophe"), an anthology in which emphasized the theme of the Holocaust
 Shloyme Shenhud, a book of poetry
 A. N. Shtensl, a book of poetry
 I. J. Shvarts, a book of poetry
 I. Taubes, a book of poetry
 Meyer Ziml Tkach, a book of poetry
 Shneyer Vaserman, a book of poetry
 Avrom Zak, a book of poetry
 Reyzl Zhykhlinsky, a book of poetry

Other
 Bella Akhmadulina, Struna ("The String"), Soviet Union
 Ruy de Moura Belo, O problema da habitação—alguns aspectos ("The Quandary of Living: Some Aspects'", Portugal
 Inger Christensen, Lys: digte ("Light"), Denmark
 Wisława Szymborska: Sól ("Salt"), Poland

Awards and honors

United Kingdom
 Eric Gregory Award: Donald Thomas, James Simmons, Brian Johnson, Jenny Joseph
 Queen's Gold Medal for Poetry: Christopher Fry

United States
 Bollingen Prize: John Hall Wheelock and Richard Eberhart
 National Book Award for Poetry: Alan Dugan, Poems Pulitzer Prize for Poetry: Alan Dugan: Poems Fellowship of the Academy of American Poets: John Crowe Ransom
 Yale Series of Younger Poets Competition: Jack Gilbert: MonolithosAwards in other nations
 Grand Prix National des Lettres (France): Pierre Jean Jouve
 Grand prix de littérature de l'Académie française (France): Luc Estang, for his work as a whole
 Australia: Grace Leven Prize for Poetry, Southmost Twelve, R. D. Fitzgerald
 Canada: Governor General's Award, poetry or drama: Twelve Letters to a Small Town and The Winter Sun and Other Plays, James Reaney
 Canada: Governor General's Award, Poésie et théâtre: Les insolites et les violons de l'automne'', Jacques Languirand

Births
 May 13 – Kathleen Jamie, Scottish poet and essayist
 May 21 – Stacy Doris (died 2012), American poet writing in English and French
 May 30 – Elizabeth Alexander, American poet
 June 9 – Paul Beatty, African-American poet and author
 June 25 – Phill Jupitus, born Phillip Swan, English comedian and performance poet
 July 30 – Lavinia Greenlaw, English poet, librettist and fiction writer
 October 9 – Durs Grünbein, German poet
 August 25 – Taslima Nasrin, Bangladeshi-born poet, writer, physician and feminist
 August 27 – Sjón, born Sigurjón Birgir Sigurðsson, Icelandic poet, lyricist and novelist
 October 24 – Nujoom Al-Ghanem, Emirati Arabic poet and film director
 December 6 – Julia Kasdorf, American poet
 December 31 – Machi Tawara 俵万智, Japanese writer, translator and poet
 March 13 – Seyhan Erözçelik, Turkish poet (died 2011)
 Also:
 Glyn Maxwell, British poet and author
 Jean Sprackland, English poet and essayist
 Virgil Suárez, Cuban American poet and novelist

Deaths
Birth years link to the corresponding "[year] in poetry" article:
 January 20 – Robinson Jeffers, 85 (born 1887), American poet and playwright
 March 16 – Dora Adele Shoemaker, 89 (born 1873), American poet, playwright, educator
 March 18 – George Sylvester Viereck, 77 (born 1884), American poet and novelist, as well as a pro-German propagandist during both World War I and World War II
 May 26 – Wilfrid Wilson Gibson, 83 (born 1878), English poet
 June 2 – Vita Sackville-West, 70 (born 1892), English novelist and poet
 June 8 – William Stanley Braithwaite (born 1878), American poet
 June 22 – John Holmes, 58, American educator and poet
 July 27 – Richard Aldington, 70, English writer and poet
 August 9 – Hermann Hesse, 95, Swiss novelist and poet in German
 August 18 – Rosemary Carr Benét, 65(?), poet and widow of Stephen Vincent Benét

 August 29 – Alan Mulgan (born 1881), New Zealand poet
 September 2 – Natalia Negru, 79 (born 1882), Romanian poet
 September 3 – E. E. Cummings, 67 (born 1894), American poet, of a stroke;
 October 3 – Dakotsu Iida 飯田 蛇笏, commonly referred to as "Dakotsu", pen names of Takeji Iida 飯田 武治 (born 1885), Japanese haiku poet; trained under Takahama Kyoshi
 November 3 – Ralph Hodgson, 91 (born 1871), English poet
 December 3 – Dame Mary Gilmore, 97, Australian socialist, poet and journalist

See also

 Poetry
 List of poetry awards
 List of years in poetry

Notes

Poetry
20th-century poetry